Playboy's Dark Justice is a half-hour, computer-animated, softcore pornographic TV series shown on Playboy TV premiering on September 3, 2000, and running for 20 (of an intended 26) episodes until 2001, and was perhaps the first and only show of its kind created. 

Unlike most talk, variety, and reality series on Playboy TV, Dark Justice has characters and story arcs. The show features a heroine named Justina (voiced by Veronica Hart), who fights crime as part of a vigilante force in a dystopian world in Metro City in 2120. The plots inevitably lead to Justina and others in sexual situations.

The series was directed by Michael Ninn, with Robert C. England as technical director, lead animator, motion-capture actor, and the voice of Wendell, and produced by Ninn and Hart (among others) through Hope Ranch Productions, and featured a number of porn stars as voice actors and models for motion capture animated with 3D Studio Max and Character Studio.

Dark Justice was the only completed film and television production from Hope Ranch until its acquisition by Pure Play Media in 2002 and name change to Ninn Worx. The name "Hope Ranch" appears to have been later used for the alternate reality game Kronos480BC promoting the Ninn Worx production "The Four".

Characters
Justina 
Lacy White 
Trevor & Wendell 
The Sarge 
Lance Larson
Lonnie Lovet
Lou Stone 
Taffy Dugan
Mayor Julio Camarones 
Chili "Bean" Johnson

Villains
Mr. Big 
Morell Dekay 
Miz Behave 
Won Hung Low 
Regina 
Doctor Dick

References

External links

Playboy's Dark Justice at Toonarific Cartoons
Playboy's Dark Justice - Episode Guide MSN TV (includes episode list and air dates)
Playboy TV Disrobes New CGI Series
Playboy TV Slates Animated PPV Series By: R. Thomas Umstead

Negative review at Everything2.com
Series description by Juan Duque

2000 American television series debuts
2001 American television series endings
American adult animated television series
Erotic television series
Softcore pornography
English-language television shows
Playboy TV original programming
Pornographic animation
Dystopian television series
Television series by Playboy Enterprises
Television series set in the 22nd century